Krita is a free and open-source raster graphics editor designed primarily for digital art and 2D animation. The software runs on Windows, macOS, Linux, Android, and ChromeOS, and features an OpenGL-accelerated canvas, colour management support, an advanced brush engine, non-destructive layers and masks, group-based layer management, vector artwork support, and switchable customisation profiles.

Name
It follows the "K" prefix like everything else in the KDE suite.

History

Early development of the project can be tracked back to 1998 when Matthias Ettrich, founder of KDE, showcased a Qt GUI hack for GIMP at Linux Kongress. The idea of building a Qt-based image editor was later passed to KImage, maintained by Michael Koch, as a part of KOffice suite. In 1999, Matthias Elter proposed the idea of building the software using CORBA around ImageMagick. To avoid existing trademarks on the market, the project underwent numerous name changes: KImageShop, Krayon, until it was finally settled with "Krita" in 2002. The first public version of Krita was released with KOffice 1.4 in 2004. In years between 2004 and 2009, Krita was developed as a generic image manipulation software like Photoshop and GIMP.

A change of direction happened to the project in 2009, with a new goal of becoming digital painting software like Corel Painter and SAI. Also from that point, the project began to experiment with various ways of funding its development, including Google Summer of Code and funded jobs for students. As a result, the development gained speed and resulted in better performance and stability.

The Krita Foundation was created in 2013 to provide support for Krita's development. It collaborated with Intel to create Krita Sketch as a marketing campaign and Krita Studio with KO GmbH as a commercially supported version for movie and VFX studios. Kickstarter campaigns have been used to crowdfund Krita's development since 2014.

On May 23, 2020, the beta version of Krita was released for Android and ChromeOS.

Design and features

The current version of Krita is developed with Qt 5 and KDE Frameworks 5. It is designed primarily for concept artists, illustrators, matte and texture artists, and the VFX industry. It has the following key features:

User experience design

The most prominent feature of Krita is arguably its UX design with graphics tablet users in mind. It uses a combination of pen buttons, keyboard modifiers and an icon-based HUD to ensure frequently-used functions can be accessed by fewer clicks, without the need to search through text-based menus.

Most-used drawing commands can be accessed via touch by combining keyboard modifiers with pen/mouse buttons and gestures:

Pop-up Palette is Krita's right click HUD. It enables instant access to the following functions:

Painting tools
Krita's core digital painting tools include:

Animation tools
Krita's animation tools are designed for frame-by-frame raster animation. They have the following features:

Vector tools
Krita uses vector tools for non-destructive editing of the following objects:
 Path
 Selection
 Text (artistic, multiline, calligraphy)
 Vector art
 Fill and gradient

Layers and masks
Krita's layer and mask features include:

Customisation

Krita's resource manager allows each brush or texture preset to be tagged by a user and quickly searched, filtered and loaded as a group. A collection of user-made presets can be packaged as "bundles" and loaded as a whole. Krita provides many such brush set and texture bundles on its official website.

Customisable tool panels are known as Dockers in Krita. Actions include:
 2 customisable toolbars
 Toggle display of each docker
 Attach any docker to any sides of main window, or detach to float free
 Buttons to collapse/expand each docker panel
 Group dockers by tabs
Workspaces allow UI customizations for different workflows to be saved and loaded on demand.

Display
OpenGL accelerated canvas is used to speed up Krita's performance. It provides the following benefits:
 Better framerate and response time: pen actions can be reflected without delay
 Better-quality, fast and continuous zooming, panning, rotation, wrap-around and mirroring
 Requires a GPU with OpenGL 3.0 support for optimal experience. In the case of Intel HD Graphics, that means Ivy Bridge and above.

Full colour management is supported in Krita with the following capabilities:
 Assign and convert between colour spaces 
 Realtime colour proofing, including colour-blind mode 
 Colour model supported: RGBA, Grey, CMYKA, Law, YCbCr, XYZ 
 Colour depth supported: 8-bit integer, 16-bit integer, 16-bit floating point, 32-bit floating point

Filters

Krita has a collection of built-in filters and supports G'MIC filters. It has real-time filter preview support.

Filters included in a default installation: levels, colour adjustment curves, brightness/contrast curve, desaturate, invert, auto contrast, HSV adjustment, pixelise, raindrops, oil paint, gaussian blur, motion blur, blur, lens blur, colour to alpha, color transfer, minimise channel, maximise channel, top/left/bottom/right edge detection, sobel, sharpen, mean removal, unsharp mask, gaussian noise removal, wavelet noise reducer, emboss horizontal only/in all directions/(laplacian)/vertical only/with variable depth/horizontal and vertical, small tiles, round corners, phong bumpmap.

File formats supported
Krita's native document format is Krita Document (.kra). It can also save to many other file formats including PSD.

Mascot

Krita's mascot is Kiki the Cyber Squirrel, a robotic, anthropomorphic squirrel character created by Tyson Tan. The community collectively decided the mascot to be a squirrel. The first version of Kiki was posted to the KDE forum in 2012 and was used in Krita version 2.6's introduction booklet. Kiki has been used as Krita's startup splash screen since Krita version 2.8. So far, each new version of Krita has come with a new version of Kiki. Kiki has been used for Krita's merchandise shop items and Krita's Steam project artworks.

Sprint events
Krita sprints are events during which Krita developers and artists get together for a few days, exchange ideas and do programming face-to-face, in order to speedup development and improve relationships between members.

Variations
 Krita Gemini, optimised for tablets and touch interaction.
 Krita Studio, commercially supported version for movie and VFX studios.

See also 

 Comparison of raster graphics editors
 List of free and open-source software packages
 List of computing mascots

Similar Programs
 MediBang Paint
 GIMP
 MyPaint
 Clip Studio Paint
 Photoshop

References

External links

 

2005 software
Android (operating system) software
Cross-platform free software
Free 2D animation software
Free and open-source software
Free raster graphics editors
Graphics software
Graphics software that uses Qt
KDE Applications
Kickstarter-funded software
Macintosh graphics software
MacOS graphics software
Portable software
Raster graphics editors
Raster graphics editors for Linux
Software that uses Qt
Windows graphics-related software